Ammodiscus is a genus in the family Ammodiscidae of textulariid foraminifera. Ammodiscus species are vagile, epibenthic foraminiferans, usually found in seawater with normal salinity.

References

External links 
 BioLib - Ammodiscus
 WoRMS taxon details: Ammodiscus Reuss, 1862

Foraminifera genera
Extant Silurian first appearances